The 2016 Slovak Cup Final decided the winner of the 2015–16 Slovak Cup, the 47th season of Slovakia's main football cup. It was played on 29 April 2016 at the Štadión Antona Malatinského in Trnava, between ŠK Slovan Bratislava and FK AS Trenčín. AS Trenčín defeated ŠK Slovan Bratislava 3-1.

Road to the final
Note: In all results below, the score of the finalist is given first (H: home; A: away).

Details

References

Slovak Cup Finals
Cup Final
Slovak Cup
Slovak Cup